Wally May (11 September 1926 – 16 May 2011) was an Australian rules footballer in the Victorian Football League (VFL) and later in the South Australian Football League SANFL.

Recruited locally, Wally 'Chooka' May played as a ruckman and a defender for Essendon in 94 VFL games between 1947 and 1952. 

Runner-up in Essendon's best and fairest award in 1951, May asked for a clearance two years later to Sturt, and when this was refused, he stood out of football for a year until it was granted. 

In four seasons with the Double Blues, May played a total of 54 league games, plus 2 for South Australia, winning his club's best and fairest award in 1955.  The 1956 season saw him installed as captain-coach, but after a dismal season that produced just 3 wins and a draw from 18 games, he resigned, citing 'business reasons'. He decided to remain with the club as a player under his replacement coach, Ed Tilley.

After retiring from the sport, May remained in Adelaide and worked as a caster and a commenter talent during SANFL match telecasts.

Wally May died on Monday, 16 May 2011.

References

External links

Essendon Football Club players
Essendon Football Club Premiership players
Sturt Football Club players
Sturt Football Club coaches
Australian rules footballers from Victoria (Australia)
1926 births
2011 deaths
Two-time VFL/AFL Premiership players